The Mineral and Lapidary Museum of Henderson County is a non-profit, volunteer-run museum in Hendersonville, North Carolina founded in 1997 at 400 North Main Street in the middle of the city's Historic District.

Located in Western North Carolina in the geologically rich Blue Ridge Mountains, the decade-old museum has been nicknamed The Geode-Cracking Museum. On a typical day, geodes are cracked in half by volunteer staff.

The Ultimate Guide to Asheville & The Western North Carolina Mountains explains that "The purpose of the museum is to support the education of the children of Henderson and neighboring counties in the Earth Science areas of Mineralogy, Geology, Paleontology and the associated Lapidary Arts. The museum has ongoing exhibits of regional minerals and gemstones of interest to the general public and a workshop where gem-cutting and polishing demonstrations are held."

The guidebook further elaborates that "This museum is run by the Henderson County Gem and Mineral Society [HCGMS], a valuable source of information for those people interested in rock hounding in the mountains." Prof. Ralph W. Bastedo, an HCGMS member and lecturer, notes that "Furthermore, the museum itself is a valuable learning tool in the Appalachian Mountains for adults seeking introductory and stimulating information about our planet earth generally."

Exhibits 

The AAA boasts that the petrology and natural history museum features a variety of "gems, minerals, geodes and fossils from around the world." The regional exhibits include dozens of stone and mineral specimens from North Carolina, and a long wall of local Henderson Augen Gneiss.

A six-foot-tall purple amethyst geode from Brazil is the largest geode on display. Another exhibit features more than two dozen pairs of colorful quartz and calcite geodes from Mexico.

An unusual mineralology exhibit presents three dozen fluorescent minerals, such as fluorite, opal, willemite, calcite, ruby and sodalite. Phosphorescence is illustrated by the use of (a) short-wave ultraviolet light and (b) long-wave ultraviolet light—also known as black light—as well as (c) by the use of both combined.

Among the gemstones exhibited are four replica versions of the Hope Diamond, including a reproduction of the large 18th-century French Blue Diamond.

Chunks of the 1901 Hendersonville iron-nickel meteorite are displayed nearby. The museum also displays local Native American archeological artifacts. The Garden Creek site in Haywood County showed evidence of human habitation from 8000 BCE. Remains of villages and earthwork mounds show construction in the late prehistoric era, as well as likely historic Cherokee. 

The Mineral and Lapidary Museum has a replica Tyrannosaurus rex skull from the Cretaceous period of the Mesozoic era. Another skull is that of Smilodon, the big sabre-tooth cat from the Pleistocene epoch of the Cenozoic era. In addition there ae —not to overlook a replica tusk and femur from a prehistoric mastodon.

Children are welcomed to touch the authentic (non-avian) dinosaur eggs on display.   Laid by a duck-billed hadrosaur many millions of years ago during the late Mesozoic, these fossilized eggs were discovered in Hunan Province, China.

The museum has three giant tree trunks of petrified wood, permineralized by the passage of vast geologic time. Visitors may actually rest on these relics of the distant, deep past.

See also
 List of museums in North Carolina

References

External links
 Official  Mineral & Lapidary Museum website
 North Carolina Museums Council
 North Carolina Exploring Cultural Heritage Online - includes listings and photos of NC museums
 Learn NC
 Osomin website - List of Mineral & fossil museums in the United States]

Mineralogy museums
Natural history museums in North Carolina
Museums in Henderson County, North Carolina
Geology museums in the United States
Paleontology in North Carolina
Hendersonville, North Carolina